Nikol Ġużeppi Cauchi (2 March 1929 Gharb, Malta15 November 2010 Malta) was the Roman Catholic Bishop of Gozo, Malta.

Ordained in 1952, he was named auxiliary bishop of the Gozo Diocese in 1967 and was appointed diocesan bishop in 1972 retiring in 2005. He died in 2010, aged 81.

References 

1929 births
2010 deaths
20th-century Roman Catholic bishops in Malta
21st-century Roman Catholic bishops in Malta
People from Għarb
Roman Catholic bishops of Gozo